The National University of Salta is an Argentine public  national university in Salta. It was founded on 11 May 1972 as a part of the Plan Taquini, a reorganization plan for education. It has around 20,000 students.

Overview

The university has regional headquarters in Tartagal and Orán.
It has six subdivisions: Economic Sciences, Exacts Sciences, Natural Sciences, Humanities, Engineering and Health Science. The radio station "Radio Universidad Nacional de Salta" is based at UNSa.

See also
 Argentine Universities

External links
 Official website
 School of Economic, Social and Law Sciences
 School of Natural Science
 School of Exact Science (Math)
 School of Humanities
 School of Engineering
 School of Health Science
 Library of the School of Economic, Social and Law Sciences
 Science and Education in Argentina
 Argentine Higher Education Official Site

Salta
Buildings and structures in Salta Province
Education in Salta Province
Educational institutions established in 1972
Buildings and structures in Salta